The Formosan Association for Public Affairs (FAPA) is a Washington, D.C.-based nonprofit organization that seeks to build worldwide support for Taiwan independence. Its name "Formosan" refers to Taiwan's historical name of "Formosa", and its 43 chapters seek to advance the interests of Taiwanese people and communities around the world.

In 2018, its President was Dr. Mike Kuo. Currently, the President of FAPA is Dr. Minze Chien

History
Established in 1982 in Los Angeles, California, FAPA subsequently moved its headquarters to Washington, D.C. The organization provides U.S. policymakers, the media, scholars and the general public with information on issues related to Taiwan.

Goals
Promote international support for the right of the people of Taiwan to establish an independent and democratic sovereign state, and to join the international community.
Advance the rights and interests of Taiwanese communities throughout the world.
Promote peace and security for Taiwan.
To promote relations and cooperation between Taiwan and the United States.
To protect the right of self-determination for the people of Taiwan.

FAPA Young Professional Group
FAPA Young Professional Group is an affiliate organization primarily targeted at second-generation Taiwanese-Americans who are generally in their 20s and 30s.  Their goals, which parallel those of FAPA, are:

To promote international recognition for the right of the people of Taiwan to establish an independent and democratic country and to join the international community.
To advance the rights and interests of Taiwanese communities throughout the world.
To promote peace and security for Taiwan.
To provide young proponents of Taiwan with the knowledge and skills necessary for grassroots advocacy on Taiwan's behalf.

YPG hosts an annual national conference in DC, during which participants visit their Congressional representatives to voice concerns about the US-Taiwan relationship, as well as regional events throughout the year.

International branches

Canada
The Formosan Association for Public Affairs Canada (FAPA Canada) is a non-profit organization based in Toronto. FAPA Canada aims to promote the sovereignty of Taiwan in Canada and across the world.  The current president of FAPA Canada is Dr. Harry Chen.

FAPA Canada was established originally as a chapter of the United States Formosan Association for Public Affairs in 
1984, but was transformed into an independent organization in 1993.  FAPA Canada takes an active role in
cultivating a good relationship with the Parliament of Canada; encouraging Canada-Taiwan political, economical, 
and cultural exchanges; and informing politicians and policy makers about the aspirations of the Taiwanese people.

Recent activities of FAPA Canada include letter writing campaigns to
Canadian Members of Parliament and press releases supporting 
Taiwan's sovereignty in the international arena.
It has also succeeded in publishing letters to the editor in several Canadian newspapers.

Europe
The Formosan Association for Public Affairs Europe (FAPA Europe) is a non-profit organization based in Freiburg, Mainz, and Athens. FAPA Europe aims to promote the sovereignty of Taiwan in Europe and across the world.  It was established in 2007, and was inspired by FAPA USA. The current chairperson of FAPA Europe is Jenny Hsieh.

FAPA Europe operates in three languages: English, French, and German.

The organization has had several letters to the editor published in various European newspapers.  It also distributes the occasional press release, and has posted a number of online articles.

See also
 Four Wants and One Without

References

External links
FAPA America
FAPA Canada
FAPA Europe

Advocacy groups in the United States
Asian-American culture in Washington, D.C.
Non-profit organizations based in Washington, D.C.
Taiwanese-American culture
Taiwan independence movement
Taiwan–United States relations
Advocacy groups in Canada
Canada–Taiwan relations
Advocacy groups in Germany